Parran is a surname. Notable people with the surname include:

J. D. Parran, American multi-woodwind player, educator and composer
Royce Parran (born 1985), American basketball player
Thomas Parran Jr. (1892–1968), American physician and Public Health Service officer
Thomas Parran Sr. (1860–1955), American politician

See also
Parran Hall, is an academic building on the campus of the University of Pittsburgh on Fifth Avenue in Pittsburgh, Pennsylvania, United States
Parran, Maryland, is an unincorporated community located at the crossroads of MD 263, Cox Road, and Emmanuel Church Road in Calvert County, Maryland, United States

References